Still Life with Lobster, Drinking Horn and Glasses is a 1653 painting by Dutch artist Willem Kalf. The painting is a still life, and has been referred to as "...a monument to luxury". The horn in the painting dates to 1565, and is held in the Amsterdam Museum.

References

1653 paintings
Collections of the National Gallery, London
Still life paintings
Crustaceans in art